McGill is a surname of Scottish and Irish origin, from which the names of many places and organizations are derived. It may refer to:

People
 McGill (surname) (including a list of individuals with the surname)
 McGill family (Monrovia), a prominent early Americo-Liberian family
 Anglicized variant for Clan Makgill, a Lowland Scottish clan
 Donald McGillivray (botanist), botanical taxonomist whose standard author abbreviation is “McGill”.

Organizations
 McGill University, a research university located in Montreal, Quebec, Canada
 McGill-Toolen Catholic High School, a private coeducational high school in Mobile, Alabama, United States
 McGill Executive Institute, a business school within McGill University located in Montreal, Quebec, Canada
 McGill Drug Store, a historical museum in McGill, Nevada
 McGill's Bus Services, bus operating firm based in Greenock, Inverclyde, Scotland
 McGill Motorsports, a NASCAR Busch Series team

Places
 McGill (Montreal Metro), a metro (subway) station in Montreal, Quebec
 McGill, Nevada, a United States census-designated place in White Pine County, Nevada
 McGill Airport, an airport in Clackamas County, Oregon
 McGill Street (Vancouver), an east–west street in Vancouver, British Columbia
 McGill Street (Montreal), a street in Montreal, Quebec
 McGill College Avenue, a street in Montreal, Quebec
 Brandon Municipal Airport, also known as McGill Field, an airport near Brandon, Manitoba

See also
 McGill Pain Questionnaire
 Magill (disambiguation)